The Virginia Cavaliers baseball team represents the University of Virginia in NCAA Division I college baseball.  Established in 1889, the team participates in the Coastal division of the Atlantic Coast Conference and plays its home games at Davenport Field.  The team's head coach is Brian O'Connor. The team has played in the College World Series five times, most recently in 2021, and won the national championship in 2015.

History 
Virginia played its first baseball game, a 13–4 win over Richmond College, in 1889. The Cavaliers had limited success in their first 100 years of play, making their NCAA tournament debut in 1972 under Jim West and returning in 1985 and 1996 under Dennis Womack, failing to advance past regional play. They won their first ACC tournament championship in 1996 behind the pitching of All-American righthander Seth Greisinger. One highlight was the performance of left-handed pitcher Eppa Rixey, who won 266 games for the Philadelphia Phillies and Cincinnati Reds from 1912–1933 and was inducted into the Baseball Hall of Fame as a Veterans Committee selection in 1963.

In 1966, left-handed pitcher Edward Turnbull became the program's first MLB draft pick, going to the Baltimore Orioles in the 17th round. Outfielder Brian Buchanan was the first Virginia player to become a first-round pick, going to the New York Yankees in the 1994 draft.

Tiering proposal and Davenport Field
In 2001, the program was threatened by recommendations from a university task force that would have split the school's sports into four tiers, with each tier funded differently. The baseball program was placed in the lowest tier and would have lost the ability to offer athletic scholarships if the recommendation was implemented, but the university's Board of Visitors rejected the proposal.

The next year, the Virginia athletic department took steps to increase the program's competitiveness, notably renovating the team's stadium, which was renamed Davenport Field after longtime athletic administrator and former baseball coach Ted Davenport, who had died in 2001. The expansion was funded by $2 million in anonymous donations, believed to have come from bestselling author John Grisham, a Charlottesville resident whose son, Ty, played for the team. Before the renovation, the field did not have lights, and the infield was made of artificial turf handed down from an old football facility. Bermuda grass was installed during the renovations.

Brian O'Connor era 
Womack stepped down in 2004, and Notre Dame associate head coach Brian O'Connor took over and made an immediate impact, with the program hosting its first NCAA regional in his first season. As of the 2017 season, the Cavaliers have made the NCAA tournament every year of O'Connor's tenure and captured ACC tournament championships in 2009 and 2011.

Virginia hosted NCAA regionals again in 2006 and 2007, but did not advance until 2009. That year, the Cavaliers won the Irvine Regional, defeating San Diego State ace Stephen Strasburg in the process, and defeated Ole Miss in the Oxford Super Regional to advance to the program's first College World Series, where they finished fifth, bowing out in a 12-inning loss to Arkansas.

The Cavaliers won the Charlottesville Regional again in 2010, but lost to Oklahoma in the Charlottesville Super Regional. In 2011, entering the NCAA tournament as the top overall seed, they swept the Charlottesville Regional and rallied from a ninth-inning deficit to defeat UC Irvine on a two-run single from Chris Taylor in the Charlottesville Super Regional. They finished third in the College World Series, losing to eventual champion South Carolina in 13 innings.

In 2013, Virginia swept the Charlottesville Regional before losing to Mississippi State in the Charlottesville Super Regional. In 2014, the Cavaliers reached previously unprecedented heights, losing 3–2 to Vanderbilt in a decisive Game 3 of the College World Series finals. They had swept the Charlottesville Regional and defeated Maryland in the Charlottesville Super Regional.

2015 NCAA Champions 
In 2015, an injury-riddled Virginia team slumped in the regular season and needed a series win in the final regular-season series at North Carolina to sew up a bid in the ACC tournament. They made the NCAA tournament as a No. 3 seed and swept through the Lake Elsinore Regional, defeating Southern California (twice) and San Diego State. They hosted Maryland in the Charlottesville Super Regional and clinched a trip to the College World Series on Ernie Clement's two-run single in the bottom of the ninth of the second game.

In Omaha, Virginia defeated Arkansas and Florida (twice) to set up a finals rematch with Vanderbilt. The Commodores won the first game 5–1 before the Cavaliers evened the series with a 3–0 victory behind five innings from surprise starter Adam Haseley and four from Josh Sborz. Virginia fell behind early in the decisive third game, giving up two runs in the first inning, but Pavin Smith homered to pull the Cavaliers even and singled to score Haseley with the eventual winning run. Brandon Waddell threw seven strong innings, aided by an acrobatic, run-saving stop from third baseman Kenny Towns, as the Cavaliers won 4–2 to capture the program's first national championship and the first for an ACC program since Wake Forest in 1955.

Notable former players

Active Major League Baseball (MLB) players
Alec Bettinger, RHP, Milwaukee Brewers
Ernie Clement, 2B/3B/OF, Cleveland Guardians
Sean Doolittle, LHP, Washington Nationals
Derek Fisher, OF, Milwaukee Brewers
Phil Gosselin, 2B, Los Angeles Angels
Adam Haseley, OF, Philadelphia Phillies
 John Hicks, C, Texas Rangers
Artie Lewicki, RHP, Free agent
Daniel Lynch, LHP, Kansas City Royals
Jake McCarthy, OF, Arizona Diamondbacks
Josh Sborz, RHP, Texas Rangers
Pavin Smith, 1B/OF, Arizona Diamondbacks
Chris Taylor, SS, Los Angeles Dodgers
Matt Thaiss, 1B/3B, Los Angeles Angels
Brandon Waddell, LHP, St. Louis Cardinals

Notable former MLB players
Kyle Crockett, LHP, Cleveland Indians, Cincinnati Reds
Mike Cubbage, 3B, Texas Rangers, Minnesota Twins, New York Mets
Hank Foiles, C, Cincinnati Reds, Cleveland Indians, Pittsburgh Pirates, Kansas City Athletics, Detroit Tigers, Baltimore Orioles, Los Angeles Angels
Brandon Guyer, OF, Tampa Bay Rays, Cleveland Indians
Ricky Horton, LHP, St. Louis Cardinals, Chicago White Sox, Los Angeles Dodgers
Javier López, LHP, San Francisco Giants
Jarrett Parker, OF, San Francisco Giants, Los Angeles Angels
Mark Reynolds, 1B, Arizona Diamondbacks, Baltimore Orioles, Cleveland Indians, New York Yankees, Milwaukee Brewers, St. Louis Cardinals, Colorado Rockies, Washington Nationals
Eppa Rixey, LHP, Philadelphia Phillies, Cincinnati Reds, 1963 Hall of Fame inductee
Michael Schwimer, RHP, Philadelphia Phillies
Monte Weaver, RHP, Washington Senators, Boston Red Sox
Tyler Wilson, RHP, Baltimore Orioles
Ryan Zimmerman, 1B/3B, Washington Nationals

First-Round MLB Draft Picks
 Jimmy Blankenship, P, Pittsburgh Pirates, 1975
Brian Buchanan, OF, New York Yankees, 1994
Seth Greisinger, RHP, Detroit Tigers, 1996
Ryan Zimmerman, 3B, Washington Nationals, 2005
Sean Doolittle, 1B/LHP, Oakland Athletics, 2007
Danny Hultzen, LHP, Seattle Mariners, 2011
Nick Howard, RHP, Cincinnati Reds, 2014
Mike Papi, OF, Cleveland Indians, 2014
Nathan Kirby, LHP, Milwaukee Brewers, 2015
Matt Thaiss, C, Los Angeles Angels, 2016
Pavin Smith, 1B, Arizona Diamondbacks, 2017
Adam Haseley, OF, Philadelphia Phillies, 2017
Daniel Lynch, LHP, Kansas City Royals, 2018
Jake McCarthy, OF, Arizona Diamondbacks, 2018

(Includes supplemental and competitive-balance picks)

Honors

First-Team All-Americans
1972: Jimmy Blankenship, P (BA)
1973: Jimmy Blankenship, P (BA)
1974: Jimmy Blankenship, P (BA)
1994: Brian Buchanan, OF (BA)
1996: Seth Greisinger, RHP (ABCA, BA, CB)
2007: Jacob Thompson, RHP (ABCA, BA, CB)
2009: Danny Hultzen, UTIL (ABCA)
2010: Kevin Arico, RHP (NCBWA, CB)
2010: Danny Hultzen, LHP (ABCA, CB, NCBWA)
2011: Danny Hultzen, UTIL (BA, CB), LHP (ABCA)
2013: Mike Papi, OF (ABCA, BA)
2014: Nathan Kirby, LHP (ABCA, BA, CB)
2016: Connor Jones, RHP (ABCA)
2017: Adam Haseley, OF (ABCA, BA)

National Coach of the Year
2006: Brian O'Connor (CBF)
2009: Brian O'Connor (NCBWA, CBI)
2015: Brian O'Connor (CB, PG, BA)

Legend:
ABCA = American Baseball Coaches Association
BA = Baseball America
CB = Collegiate Baseball/Louisville Slugger
CBF = College Baseball Foundation
CBI = CollegeBaseballInsider.com
NCBWA = National College Baseball Writers Association
PG = Perfect Game

College World Series All-Tournament Team
2009
Tyler Cannon, SS
2014
Branden Cogswell, 2B
Brandon Downes, OF
Nate Irving, C
Artie Lewicki, P
Brandon Waddell, P
2015
Ernie Clement, 2B
Daniel Pinero, SS
Kenny Towns, 3B
Josh Sborz, P
Brandon Waddell, P
2021
Zack Gelof, 3B

College World Series Most Outstanding Player
2015: Josh Sborz, P

ACC Player of the Year
1974: Jimmy Blankenship, P/SS
2004: Joe Koshansky, P/1B
2006: Sean Doolittle, P/1B

ACC Pitcher of the Year
1973: Jimmy Blankenship 
1974: Jimmy Blankenship 
2010: Danny Hultzen
2011: Danny Hultzen
2014: Nathan Kirby (co-winner)

ACC Coach of the Year
1987: Dennis Womack
2004: Brian O'Connor
2010: Brian O'Connor
2011: Brian O'Connor
2013: Brian O'Connor
2014: Brian O'Connor

Head coaches 

Unknown (1889–1909) 288–167–9 (Duffy may have been coach during this period)
Charles Rigler (1910–12) 32–32–2 
Jack Ryan (1913–1916, 1922) 60–43–1
James L. White (1917, 1920) 13–9–1
Henry Lannigan (1918) 7–4–0
E. W. Smith (1919) 8–8–1
W. Rice Warren (1921) 7–15–0
Earle "Greasy" Neale (1923–29) 80–73–2
Roy Randall (1930) 2–12–0
Gus Tebell (1931–43, 1945–55) 266–189–9
A. A. Corcoran (1944) 6–5–1
Evan "Bus" Male (1956–59) 36–50–0
Ted Davenport (1960–61) 10–26–2
James West (1962–80) 281–276–5
Dennis Womack (1981–2003) 594–605–7
Brian O'Connor (2004–present) 750–317–2

When West died on May 24, 2009, the Cavaliers added a black circle with the number "24" above the team name on their uniforms for the rest of the season.  West had worn that number when he was coach.

Virginia in the NCAA tournament 

The NCAA Division I baseball tournament started in 1947. The Cavaliers advanced to the College World Series in 2009, 2011, 2014, 2015 and 2021, finishing as the runners-up to Vanderbilt in 2014 and defeating the Commodores in 2015 to win the championship.

See also
List of NCAA Division I baseball programs

References